Pipino Isidro Cuevas González (born December 27, 1957) is a Mexican former professional boxer who competed from 1971 to 1989. He held the WBA welterweight title from 1976 to 1980.

Cuevas was inducted into both the International Boxing Hall of Fame, and the World Boxing Hall of Fame.

Professional career
Cuevas turned professional at age 14; he won only seven of his first twelve bouts but eventually put together an eight bout winning streak before losing to Andy Price. On 17 July 1976, he received a shot at the WBA welterweight title against champion Ángel Espada. Cuevas pulled off an upset victory by knocking Espada to the canvas three times in the second round. At age 18, he was the youngest welterweight champion in history. In his first defense, he traveled to Japan and defeated hometown fighter Shoji Tsujimoto by knockout.

One of the greatest wins of his career was against Argentinian Miguel Angel Campanino, who boasted an impressive record (84-4-4), including a thirty-two fight winning streak. Once again, Pipino disposed of his challenger before the end of the second round.

On 8 June 1977, he faced veteran Clyde Gray of Canada who had only been stopped twice in his entire career which included fifty-eight wins. Yet again, Cuevas pulled off another second round knock out. A few months later, Cuevas returned to the ring for a rematch against Espada. This time Cuevas defeated Espada in the eleventh round after he sustained a broken jaw. On 4 March 1978, he disposed of Harold Weston in the ninth round after Weston also sustained a broken jaw like Cuevas' previous challenger. Cuevas then defeated former champion Billy Backus in one round. On 9 September 1978, he defeated hometown favorite Pete Ranzany (40-2-1) in Sacramento, California via a second-round knockout. He defeated Scott Clark (28-1-0) in another second-round knockout. Cuevas next title defense went the distance in a unanimous decision win against the durable Randy Shields (33-5-1). On 8 December 1979, he faced Espada for a third time, stopping him in the tenth round. Cuevas then defeated South African national champion Harold Volbrecht by fifth-round knockout.

Cuevas finally lost his title in 1980 to the undefeated and up-and-coming hometown hero Thomas Hearns in Detroit. The much taller and lankier Hearns was able to use his reach to his advantage as he kept Cuevas at a distance and knocked him out in the second round. Cuevas' talent began to decline after that loss; the most notable opponent he faced was Roberto Durán, who stopped him in the fourth round in the spring of 1983. He also lost to former world title challenger Jun Sok-Hwang and future or former world champions Jorge Vaca and Lupe Aquino before finally retiring in 1989.

Pipino Cuevas fought during a period when an unusual number of accomplished welterweights were active: Sugar Ray Leonard, Wilfred Benítez, Carlos Palomino, Thomas Hearns, and Roberto Durán, although his reign had nearly come to an end as Leonard, Benítez, Hearns, and Durán emerged as welterweight champions. Cuevas successfully defended his welterweight title eleven times against ten different boxers over a four-year span. During his reign as champion, Cuevas fought the best opposition available to him. In total, the opponents he faced throughout his career had a combined record of 505-70-29. In 2003, The Ring listed Cuevas as number thirty-one on their list of the 100 greatest punchers of all time. In 2002, Cuevas became a member of the International Boxing Hall of Fame.

Retirement
Cuevas is the owner of a restaurant and a security company in Mexico City. At one point of his career, he was also the owner of a famous sports and luxury car collection, and he was one of the first boxers to sport a golden tooth. Most people probably know him for his nickname Pipino, which is far more used to refer to him than Jose by fight commentators and magazine writers.

He ran into trouble with the law in 2001 when he was accused of racketeering in Mexico, in connection with a Mexican mayor. But he was declared innocent in 2002.

His record as a boxer was of 35 wins and 15 losses, with 31 wins by knockout.

Professional boxing record

See also
List of Mexican boxing world champions
List of world welterweight boxing champions

References

External links

1957 births
Living people
Mexican male boxers
Boxers from the State of Mexico
Welterweight boxers
World welterweight boxing champions
World Boxing Association champions
International Boxing Hall of Fame inductees
20th-century Mexican people
21st-century Mexican people